Andrew Godfrey Bieber (May 14, 1917 – November 18, 1985) was a Canadian football player who played for the Winnipeg Blue Bombers. He won the Grey Cup with them in 1939 and 1941. He is a member of the Blue Bombers Hall of Fame.

References

1917 births
1985 deaths
Canadian football running backs
Winnipeg Blue Bombers players
Players of Canadian football from Manitoba
Canadian football people from Winnipeg